Tom Thumb is a diminutive hero of English folklore.

Tom Thumb may also refer to:

Arts and entertainment
 
 Tom Thumb (comics), the codename of two Marvel Comics superheroes
 Tom Thumb (film), a 1958 feature film directed by George Pal
 Tom Thumb (play), a 1730 play by Henry Fielding
 The Secret Adventures of Tom Thumb, a 1993 stop-motion animated film
 A character in the children's book The Tale of Two Bad Mice by Beatrix Potter
 Tom Thumb, a 1934 Krazy Kat film
 "Tom Thumb", a song by American jazz pianist Bobby Timmons from the 1966 album The Soul Man!
 Tom Thumb (band), a 1970s New Zealand pop band

Brands and companies
 Tom Thumb (grocery store), a chain of supermarkets in the Dallas–Fort Worth metroplex, owned by Safeway Inc.
 Tom Thumb Food Stores, a chain of convenience stores in the Florida Panhandle and southern Alabama owned by EG America
 Tom Thumb Gallery, an alternative exhibition space in Kirksville, Missouri
 Tom Thumb Theatre in Margate, England

History
 Tom Thumb (locomotive), the first American-built steam locomotive, built in 1830
 General Tom Thumb, the stage name of American performer Charles Sherwood Stratton (1838–1883)
 Tom Thumb, an open boat used by navigator Matthew Flinders and George Bass in 1796

Other uses
 Manuel Ramos (boxer) (1942–1999), nicknamed Pulgarcito (Tom Thumb), Mexican boxer
 Tom Thumb Peak, in the Howson Range, British Columbia, Canada
 Tom Thumb snaffle, a type of bit mouthpiece for horses
 Tom Thumb sausage, a hog sausage from eastern North Carolina

See also
 "Just Like Tom Thumb's Blues", a song by Bob Dylan
 Tom of T.H.U.M.B., a segment from American/Japanese children's animated television series The King Kong Show
 "Tom Thumb Tempest", an episode of the 1960s British TV series Stingray
 Tom Thumb House (disambiguation)